Belitung Regency is a regency (kabupaten) of Bangka Belitung Islands Province, Indonesia, with the town of Tanjung Pandan as the regency seat. It formerly covered the whole of Belitung island, but subsequently the eastern districts on the island have been cut out to create a new East Belitung Regency (Belitung Timur). The regency now covers an area of 2,293.69 km2, and had a population of 156,765 at the 2010 Census and 182,079 at the 2020 Census.

Administrative districts
The Regency is divided into five districts (kecamatan), tabulated below with their areas and their populations at the 2010 Census and the 2020 Census. The table includes the number of administrative villages (rural desa and urban kelurahan) and the number of offshore islands in each district, and its post code.

Note: (a) includes Mendanau Island, the fourth largest island within the province.

Transportation

H.A.S. Hanandjoeddin International Airport (Bandar udara International Has Hanandjoedin), serving flights to Jakarta, Palembang,  Pangkalpinang with Garuda Indonesia.

Laskar Pelangi Port

International terminal

Local terminal

References

External links 

  

Regencies of Bangka Belitung Islands